Chicha de piña is a Latin American spicy chicha made from pineapple crusts and cores, panela or brown sugar, and spices such as cinnamon, clove, anise, and nutmeg. It is prepared simply by putting all the ingredients in a pot of water, boiling it, and then simmering it for an hour, before either chilling it to let the flavors further concentrate, or drinking it hot. Some recipes also call for the addition of rice, milk, and vanilla.

References

Sweet drinks
Pineapples
Dominican Republic cuisine